Tekeli is a town in Mersin Province, Turkey.

Geography 

Tekeli is a part of Bozyazı district which itself is a part of Mersin Province. It is situated on a small coastal plain surrounded by the Toros Mountains.
The population of the town was 3313
 as of 2012.

History 

The territory around Tekeli was ruled in turn by Hittites, Lydians, Romans, Byzantines and Armenians. In 1225, it was annexed by the Seljuks and after the disintegration of Seljuks, it fell to Karamanids. Finally in 1466 it was incorporated in the Ottoman Empire. According to municipality, the name of the town refers to historical Turkmen tribe of Teke which is also known as the founder of Teke Beylik. The Teke Turkmens migrated from Turkestan to South West Anatolia (Antalya region) in the 13th century. Between 16th and 18th centuries a part of nomadic Teke people migrated to the present location. The village was founded in 1864. After the First World War the village was briefly occupied by Italian Army. But during the Turkish War of Independence the town became a part of Turkey on 21 May 1921. In 1987, it was declared a township.

Economy 

The most pronounced economy activity in Tekeli is greenhouse agriculture. Bananas, peanuts  and all kinds of citrus are also produced. The touristic (beach) potential of the town is also promising.

References 

Populated places in Mersin Province
Populated coastal places in Turkey
Towns in Turkey
Populated places in Bozyazı District